Symphyotrichum porteri (formerly Aster porteri) is a species of flowering plant in the family Asteraceae endemic to the foothills of the Rocky Mountains in the U.S. states of Wyoming, Colorado, and New Mexico. Its flowers have white, rarely pinkish, ray florets and yellow, becoming pink then brown, disk florets. Its limited range makes it a NatureServe Vulnerable (G3) species, and it is classified Critically Imperiled (S1) in Wyoming.

Citations

References

porteri
Flora of Wyoming
Flora of Colorado
Flora of New Mexico
Flora of the Rocky Mountains
Plants described in 1880
Taxa named by Asa Gray